is a 1975 Japanese film in Nikkatsu's Roman Porno series, directed by Nobuaki Shirai and starring Hajime Tanimoto and Terumi Azuma.

Synopsis
The film is based on a 17th-century Chinese erotic novel by Li Yu best known as The Carnal Prayer Mat.

Mio is a struggling writer who writes a pornographic book entitled Flesh Futon which becomes a surprise best seller. With his newfound wealth, Mio begins indulging in the nightlife, excusing his activities to his wife by saying it is for research. Mio's reputation comes crashing down when a prostitute reports that his penis is like a "guppy". More bad luck follows. His book is banned, and his wife puts him on a short leash. At the height of his misfortune, his house is robbed. Mio meets the robber who turns out to be the Japanese folk-hero Nezumi Kozō. The two become friends, and Kozō introduces Mio to a doctor who can perform penis-enlargement surgery. With his new equipment, Kozō and Mio become frequenters of the red-light district, until the real Nezumi Kozō appears, and evil luck returns to Mio.

Cast
 Hajime Tanimoto: Mio Kingyotei
 Maya Hiromi: Shungiku
 Rei Okamoto: O-ine
 Terumi Azuma: Nui
 Akemi Nijō: Tama Kishibe
 Tamaki Katsura: Kō Iwanabe
 Asuka Seri: Kayo
 Hiromi Igarashi: Bikuni
 Nobutaka Masutoko: Jirokichi Nezumi Kozō

Critical appraisal
In their Japanese Cinema Encyclopedia: The Sex Films, the Weissers write that Atsumi Yamatoya's script for Banned Book: Flesh Futon shifts awkwardly between sex jokes and slapstick, and that it is "wildly out of control" by the time that Mio meets the first Nezumi Kozō. By the time the real Kozō appears, the story has gone completely over-the-top. Allmovie agrees that the slapstick humor is too much, but points out that this comedy at least proves that Nikkatsu was producing more than S&M and erotic melodrama films during the 1970s.

Availability
Banned Book: Flesh Futon was released theatrically in Japan on November 22, 1975. It was released on home video in VHS format in Japan on August 16, 1983, and re-released on August 4, 1995.

Bibliography

English

Japanese

Notes

1975 films
1970s Japanese-language films
Nikkatsu films
Pink films
1970s pornographic films
1970s Japanese films